Rubidium carbonate, Rb2CO3, is a convenient compound of rubidium; it is stable, not particularly reactive, and readily soluble in water, and is the form in which rubidium is usually sold.

Preparation
This salt can be prepared by adding ammonium carbonate to rubidium hydroxide.

Uses
It is used in some kinds of glass-making by enhancing stability and durability as well as reducing its conductivity. It is also used as a part of a catalyst for preparing short-chain alcohols from feed gas.

References

Carbonates
Rubidium compounds